This is a list of members of the National Council of Provinces in the 24th Parliament of South Africa. Each of South Africa's nine provinces sends a delegation of six permanent members to the NCOP.

Eastern Cape

Free State

Gauteng

KwaZulu-Natal

Limpopo

Mpumalanga

North West

Northern Cape

Western Cape

24th South African Parliament